The football (soccer) Campeonato Brasileiro Série C 1996, the third level of Brazilian National League, was played from August 27 to December 8, 1996. The competition had 58 clubs and two of them were promoted to Série B.

Stages of the competition

First phase

Group 1

Group 2

Group 3

Group 4

Group 5

Group 6

Group 7

Group 8

Group 9

Group 10

Group 11

Group 12

Group 13

Group 14

Group 15

Group 16

Second phase

Round of 16

Quarterfinals

Semifinals

Finals

Sources

Campeonato Brasileiro Série C seasons
1996 in Brazilian football leagues